Wojszyn  is a village in the administrative district of Gmina Janowiec, within Puławy County, Lublin Voivodeship, in eastern Poland.

The village has a population of 640.

References

Wojszyn